William Hunter (14 February 1940 – 4 August 2020) was a Scottish football player and manager. Hunter spent most of his playing career with Motherwell, although he also played for Detroit Cougars, Hibernian, Hellenic and Cape Town City. Hunter also represented both Scotland and the Scottish League. After retiring as a player, Hunter was manager at Queen of the South and Inverness Caledonian.

Club career
Hunter joined Motherwell from Edinburgh Norton in 1957 with Motherwell then managed by Bobby Ancell. Hunter became part of the side that became known as the 'Ancell Babes'. Although usually played as an inside left, he also played occasionally as a winger, and was compared favourably to Gordon Smith for his performance in that role. His progression stalled after he suffered two broken arms and a broken leg within the space of a few years.

In May 1967, the Detroit Cougars paid £14,000 for his transfer and Hunter moved to the new American professional league, the NASL. His new side survived for only one year however and at the end of the 1968 NASL season, he returned to Scotland to join Hibernian. Hunter was a substitute as his new team lost the 1968–69 Scottish League Cup Final to Celtic, and he played for the Edinburgh team until 1971.

International career
Hunter earned three caps for the Scotland national team while with Motherwell, all in 1960. He scored his only Scotland goal in his first cap in a 3–3 draw with Hungary. He also played in defeats to Turkey and Wales.

Managerial career
After four years playing in South Africa, Hunter became assistant manager of Portsmouth, a role he held for three years. Hunter worked for his former Motherwell team-mate Ian St. John at Portsmouth.

He earned the opportunity to manage in his own right at Queen of the South in 1978, working with players such as Allan Ball, Iain McChesney, Nobby Clark, Crawford Boyd and Jocky Dempster. Hunter left the Dumfries club after only four months. His last involvement in football was as Inverness Caledonian's manager from 1979 to 1981.

Hunter died in August 2020, aged 80.

References

External links 
 
 

1940 births
2020 deaths

Detroit Cougars (soccer) players
Expatriate soccer players in South Africa
Expatriate soccer players in the United States
Hellenic F.C. players
Hibernian F.C. players
Motherwell F.C. players
North American Soccer League (1968–1984) players
Footballers from Edinburgh
Queen of the South F.C. managers
Scotland international footballers
Scottish expatriate sportspeople in South Africa
Scottish expatriate footballers
Scottish Football League players
Scottish football managers
Scottish footballers
United Soccer Association players
Cape Town City F.C. (NFL) players
Scottish Football League representative players
Association football inside forwards
Scotland under-23 international footballers
Scottish Football League managers
Portsmouth F.C. non-playing staff
Scottish expatriate sportspeople in the United States
National Football League (South Africa) players